Dennis Perry Tarnow (b. May 28) is an American dentist specializing in  dental implant research.  He is director of implant dentistry at Columbia University College of Dental Medicine and a  speaker on the subject of implant dentistry.

Early years and education
Tarnow was born and raised in Brooklyn, New York to Joseph and Mildred Tarnow.  After graduating from James Madison High School, he received his bachelor's degree in biology from Brooklyn College in 1968.  He attended Camp Vacamas as a child and, later in life, volunteered his time for their Hands in 4 Youth programming for close to 40 years, both as an officer and as a board member.

Tarnow wanted to be a dentist because he liked working with his hands and was fond of his own dentist when growing up.  He attended NYU College of Dentistry, graduating with his DDS in 1972.  After a one-year GPR at Brookdale Hospital, he entered the postgraduate periodontics program at NYU, receiving his certificate in 1976.  He then completed a postgraduate program in prosthodontics, also at NYU, receiving his certificate in 1978.

While in dental school, Tarnow held various jobs to help him afford tuition; he worked as a NYC taxi driver, a phlebotomist and a swim instructor.

Tarnow has a brother, Herman, who is a lawyer and who shares his time between NYC and Naples, Florida.

Career
Tarnow is board certified in periodontics and practices at Specialized Dentistry of New York (SDNY), formerly Tarnow, Fletcher, Zamzok & Smith, a joint specialty practice in Manhattan, since 1975.

Tarnow, who is a graduate of the New York University College of Dentistry, is a specialist in both periodontics and prosthodontics, and former chairman of the college’s Department of Periodontics and Implant Dentistry.  He has written over 240 scientific papers and has co-authored or contributed chapters to several textbooks, including Aesthetic Restorative Dentistry and The Single Tooth Implant, which he co-authored with Dr. Stephen Chu, his partner at SDNY. Tarnow is a section editor for two peer reviewed dental journals and on the editorial review board of ten others. He has received the Master Clinician Award from the American Academy of Periodontology and in addition, has been  named New York University’s Outstanding Teacher of the Year. The NYU College of Dentistry has named its periodontal and implant dentistry postgraduate clinical wing in his honor.

Tarnow has received many awards over his long and distinguished career, including:

 the American Academy of Esthetic Dentistry Charles L. Pincus / Ronald E. Goldman Lifetime Achievement Award in 2019
 the American College of Prosthodontists (ACP) Distinguished Lecturer Award in 2015
 the William J. Gies Award for outstanding contribution to the field of periodontology by the American Academy of Periodontology in 2005
 the 2017 Academic Excellence in Prosthodontics award from the Northeastern Gnathological Society
 the honorary Alumni Award from Columbia University College of Dental Medicine

He also received a 2005 award from the California Society of Periodontists for his outstanding contribution to the specialty of periodontists and personal commitment to the highest professional standards of dentistry.

Since May 1, 2010, Tarnow has been the director of implant education at Columbia University College of Dental Medicine.

Personal life
Together with his wife Karen, Tarnow has a son named Derek.

References

External links
 Dr. Dennis Tarnow's official website
 NYU Faculty Biography - Dennis P. Tarnow, DDS
 American Academy of Periodontology - Periodontal Program Directory
 List of Publications
 Specialized Dentistry of Fort Worth(TX) Website
 Specialized Dentistry of New York(SDNY) Website

Periodontists
Living people
Year of birth missing (living people)
New York University College of Dentistry alumni
Columbia University faculty
Columbia Medical School faculty
Brooklyn College alumni